Baltimore Hotel may refer to:

Baltimore Hotel (Muskogee, Oklahoma), U.S.
Lord Baltimore Hotel, Baltimore, Maryland, U.S.